The UCI Cyclo-cross World Championships – Junior Men's Cyclo-cross is the annual world championship for in the discipline of cyclo-cross for men in the Junior category, organised by the world governing body, the Union Cycliste Internationale. The winner has the right to wear the rainbow jersey for a full year when competing in Junior cyclo-cross events.

Palmares

Medal count by country

Czechoslovakia peacefully split up in Slovakia and Czech Republic in 1993, they are all counted separately following the IOC's example. See also talk page.

References

 
UCI Cyclo-cross World Championships